Sir Philip Montefiore Magnus-Allcroft, 2nd Baronet, CBE JP (8 February 1906 – 21 December 1988), was a British biographer. He wrote under the name Philip Magnus.

Magnus-Allcroft was born in London, the son of Laurie Magnus and Dora Marian Spielmann, the grandson of the educationalist and Conservative politician Sir Philip Magnus, 1st Baronet. He was a member of a notable Jewish family; his paternal grandmother was the historian Katie Emmanuel and his maternal grandmother was Emily Sebag-Montefiore.

Educated at Westminster School and Wadham College, Oxford, Magnus succeeded to the title of 2nd Baronet Magnus in 1933.

During the Second World War he was a captain in the Royal Artillery and the Intelligence Corps, rising to the rank of major. He married Jewell Allcroft in 1943, and in 1951 added the name of Allcroft to his own by deed poll.

In later years, as well as writing, he served as a justice of the peace, Shropshire County Councillor, chairman of its planning committee and the records committee, chairman of the governors of Attingham College and governor of Ludlow Grammar School. Between 1970 and 1977 he was a trustee of the National Portrait Gallery. He lived in Stokesay Court, Shropshire, England.

He died on 21 December 1988, aged 82. As he and his wife left no children, the title passed to his nephew, Laurence Henry Philip Magnus.

Publications
Magnus-Allcroft (under pen-name Philip Magnus) was author of several biographies:

Edmund Burke: A Prophet of the Eighteenth Century, 1939
Sir Walter Raleigh, 1952
Gladstone – a biography, 1954
Kitchener – portrait of an Imperialist, 1958
King Edward the Seventh, 1964

Arms

References 

 Encyclopaedia Judaica, art. "Magnus"
Kidd, Charles, Williamson, David (editors). Debrett's Peerage and Baronetage (1990 edition). New York: St Martin's Press, 1990.

1906 births
1988 deaths
British Jews
People educated at Westminster School, London
Alumni of Wadham College, Oxford
Jewish historians
Magnus, Sir Philip, 2nd Baronet
20th-century English historians
Royal Artillery officers
Intelligence Corps officers
British Army personnel of World War II
English justices of the peace
Councillors in Shropshire